Nawaf Mashari Abdulrahman Boushal (born 16 September 1999) is a Saudi Arabian professional footballer who plays as a right back for Saudi Professional League side Al-Nassr.

Career
Boushal started his career at hometown club Al-Fateh. On 31 August 2019, Boushal signed his first professional contract with the club. He made his debut on 22 November 2019 in the league match against Abha. On 2 March 2022, Boushal renewed his contract with Al-Fateh. On 20 January 2023, Boushal joined Al-Nassr on a four-and-a-half-year deal.

Career statistics

Club

Notes

Honours
Individual
 Saudi Professional League Young Player of the Month: September 2021

References

External links
 

1999 births
Living people
People from Al-Hasa
Association football fullbacks
Saudi Arabian footballers
Saudi Arabia youth international footballers
Saudi Arabia international footballers
Saudi Professional League players
Al-Fateh SC players
Al Nassr FC players